International Humanist News is a quarterly British journal published by International Humanist and Ethical Union which is based in London. It is published on a quarterly basis.

References

External links

News magazines published in the United Kingdom
Quarterly magazines published in the United Kingdom
Magazines published in London
Magazines with year of establishment missing